Tony Richards may refer to:
 Tony Richards (musician) (born 1957), American musician and drummer
 Tony Richards (author), English dark fantasy and horror author
 Tony Richards (footballer, born 1934) (1934–2010), English footballer for Walsall and Port Vale
 Tony Richards (footballer, born 1944), English footballerfor Mansfield Town
 Tony Richards (footballer, born 1973), English footballer for Barnet, Cambridge United, Leyton Orient and Southend United